San Juan del Río (municipality of Querétaro) is a municipality in Querétaro in central Mexico.

References

Municipalities of Querétaro